Herbert Bailey Gregory (April 10, 1884 – March 9, 1951) was an associate justice of the Supreme Court of Appeals of Virginia from 1930 until his death in 1951.

Born in Westmoreland County, Virginia to Werter Hancock and Sallie James (Payne) Gregory, he was raised in Eastern Virginia and received his early education in private schools, later attending Randolph Macon Academy at Bedford, Virginia and Pungoteague Academy in Accomack County, Virginia. In 1909, he entered Washington and Lee University where he graduated in 1911 with an LL. B degree. After graduation, he was admitted to the bar and began practice in Roanoke, Virginia. In 1923, he was appointed judge of the Twentieth Judicial Circuit and, in 1926, became judge of the Court of Law and Chancery of the City of Roanoke. Judge Gregory served on that court until he was elected, in 1930, to the Supreme Court of Appeals of Virginia, where he remained until his death. Justice Gregory received an honorary LL. D. from Washington and Lee and was a member of Phi Beta Kappa and Omicron Delta Kappa.

He was succeeded on the court by Kennon C. Whittle.

References

1884 births
1951 deaths
Justices of the Supreme Court of Virginia
Virginia lawyers
Virginia state court judges
Washington and Lee University School of Law alumni
People from Westmoreland County, Virginia
Virginia circuit court judges